Brachiaria,  or signalgrass, is a genus of plants in the grass family native to tropical and subtropical regions of Asia, Africa, Australia, southern Europe, the Americas, and various islands. There are over 100 species.

Some species are cultivated as forage. Some species of Brachiaria were probably first introduced unintentionally to the Americas in the colonial period, from slave ships. B. decumbens was introduced to Brazil in 1952 and B. ruziziensis in the 1960s. Brachiaria is the most widely used tropical grass in Central and South America, with about 40 million hectares planted in Brazil alone.

Biology
This genus was described in 1853. It is similar to Panicum, and some authors believe Panicum is ancestral to it. It has also been confused with Urochloa, and sometimes combined with it. A recent phylogenetic analysis concluded that Brachiaria and Urochloa are a monophyletic group, along with Eriochloa and Melinis, and that further molecular and morphological work is needed to establish clear relationships. In the meantime, Brachiaria and Urochloa plants are usually not difficult to distinguish from one another.

Brachiaria are annual or perennial grasses, most lacking rhizomes. The inflorescence is a branching panicle, and the plant reaches about a meter in height. The plants are bisexual and the flowers are fleshy, with 3 anthers. Some species have a prominent vein in the center of the leaf. Brachiaria are C4 species and can tolerate drier conditions and more light exposure than some other plants.

Ecology and conservation

Brachiaria can grow in many environments, from swamps to shady forest to semidesert, but generally do best in savannas and other open tropical ecosystems such as in East Africa. In Angola, B. brizantha grows on termite mounds and in the ecotone between grassland and woodland habitat. In the Kora National Reserve in Kenya, Brachiaria dominates the ground layer along with Aristida. In India, the native B. ramosa is an important food source for the Eurasian collared dove (Streptopelia decaocto) and Brachiaria species are forage for other local herbivores.

In North America, the native B. platyphylla, broadleaf signalgrass, grows after heavy rains and then reproduces prodigiously and quickly, sometimes becoming a weed.

Wide expanses of the tropics, especially the Neotropics, have been converted to Brachiaria pasture to support livestock. In Brazil, 80 million hectares of native habitat have been planted with African grasses, mostly Brachiaria.

Introduced species such as Brachiaria grasses can degrade habitat and compete with native species. In Northern Australia, the exotic B. decumbens competes with the native tree Alphitonia petriei by inhibiting the growth of seedlings, slowing the conversion of abandoned pastureland to natural forest. In the Paragominas area of Brazil, however, native forest outcompetes cultivated stands of Brachiaria and other exotic forage grasses, and ranchers struggle to maintain pasture cover. Native species may also utilize exotic Brachiaria as a food resource, such as the rock cavy (Kerodon rupestris), a native rodent of the caatinga.

Cultivation

Brachiaria is the single most important genus of forage grass for pastures in the tropics. Brachiaria cultivars can grow in infertile and acidic soils. Brazil is the leading user and producer of Brachiaria seeds in the Americas.

Mexico has put effort into improving its trade in Brachiaria cultivars, and the grass is thought to have made a positive impact on its milk and beef industries. Central American countries have also increased seed sales and area planted in the grass.  The annual growth rate of seed sales in 2009 was 32% in Mexico, 62% in Honduras, 45% in Nicaragua, 39% in Costa Rica, and 54% in Panama. The area planted with Brachiaria during this period was about 6.5% of the total surface of permanent grasses in Mexico, 12.5% in Honduras, 1% in Nicaragua, 18.7% in Costa Rica, and 0.1% in Panama.

Agricultural pests of Brachiaria include spittlebugs, leafcutter ants, and mound-building termites.

Other insect pests include:

shoot flies Atherigona oryzae, Atherigona pulla, and Atherigona punctata
caseworm Paraponyx stagnalis
red hairy caterpillars Amsacta albistriga and Amsacta moorei

Diversity
Species

 Brachiaria adspersa 
 Brachiaria advena 
 Brachiaria albicoma 
 Brachiaria ambigens 
 Brachiaria antsirabensis
 Brachiaria argentea 
 Brachiaria arida 
 Brachiaria arizonica
 Brachiaria arrecta 
 Brachiaria atrisola
 Brachiaria bemarivensis
 Brachiaria benoistii
 Brachiaria bovonei 
 Brachiaria breviglumis 
 Brachiaria brevispicata 
 Brachiaria brizantha 
 Brachiaria burmanica 
 Brachiaria capuronii
 Brachiaria chusqueoides 
 Brachiaria ciliatissima 
 Brachiaria clavipila 
 Brachiaria comata 
 Brachiaria coronifera 
 Brachiaria decaryana
 Brachiaria decumbens 
 Brachiaria deflexa 
 Brachiaria dictyoneura 
 Brachiaria dimorpha 
 Brachiaria distachya 
 Brachiaria distachyoides 
 Brachiaria dura 
 Brachiaria echinulata 
 Brachiaria eminii 
 Brachiaria epacridifolia 
 Brachiaria eruciformis
 Brachiaria falcifera
 Brachiaria fasciculata
 Brachiaria foliosa
 Brachiaria fragrans
 Brachiaria fruticulosa 
 Brachiaria fusiformis 
 Brachiaria gilesii 
 Brachiaria glomerata 
 Brachiaria grossa 
 Brachiaria holosericea 
 Brachiaria humbertiana 
 Brachiaria humidicola
 Brachiaria jaliscana 
 Brachiaria jubata 
 Brachiaria kurzii 
 Brachiaria lachnantha 
 Brachiaria lactea
 Brachiaria lata 
 Brachiaria lateritica 
 Brachiaria leandriana 
 Brachiaria leersioides 
 Brachiaria leucacrantha 
 Brachiaria lindiensis 
 Brachiaria longiflora 
 Brachiaria lorentziana 
 Brachiaria malacodes 
 Brachiaria marlothii 
 Brachiaria megastachya 
 Brachiaria mesocoma 
 Brachiaria meziana 
 Brachiaria mollis 
 Brachiaria multiculma 
 Brachiaria munae 
 Brachiaria mutica 
 Brachiaria nana 
 Brachiaria nigropedata 
 Brachiaria nilagirica 
 Brachiaria notochthona 
 Brachiaria oblita 
 Brachiaria occidentalis
 Brachiaria oligobrachiata 
 Brachiaria ophryodes 
 Brachiaria orthostachys 
 Brachiaria ovalis 
 Brachiaria paucispicata 
 Brachiaria perrieri 
 Brachiaria piligera 
 Brachiaria plantaginea 
 Brachiaria platynota
 Brachiaria platyphylla
 Brachiaria polyphylla 
 Brachiaria praetervisa 
 Brachiaria psammophila 
 Brachiaria pseudodichotoma 
 Brachiaria pubescens 
 Brachiaria pubigera 
 Brachiaria pungipes 
 Brachiaria ramosa 
 Brachiaria remota 
 Brachiaria reptans 
 Brachiaria reticulata 
 Brachiaria rugulosa 
 Brachiaria ruziziensis 
 Brachiaria scalaris 
 Brachiaria schoenfelderi 
 Brachiaria semiundulata 
 Brachiaria semiverticillata 
 Brachiaria serpens 
 Brachiaria serrata 
 Brachiaria serrifolia
 Brachiaria stefaninii
 Brachiaria stigmatisata 
 Brachiaria subquadripara
 Brachiaria subrostrata
 Brachiaria subulifolia
 Brachiaria tanimbarensis 
 Brachiaria texana 
 Brachiaria tsiafajavonensis 
 Brachiaria turbinata 
 Brachiaria umbellata 
 Brachiaria umbratilis 
 Brachiaria urochlooides 
 Brachiaria urocoides
 Brachiaria uzondoiensis 
 Brachiaria villosa 
 Brachiaria whiteana
 Brachiaria windersii 
 Brachiaria wittei 
 Brachiaria xantholeuca

Formerly included
See Acroceras, Echinochloa, Eriochloa, Panicum, Paspalum, Urochloa.

 Brachiaria ambigua = Urochloa glumaris  
 Brachiaria bulawayensis = Urochloa oligotricha 
 Brachiaria callopus = Echinochloa callopus 
 Brachiaria capuronii = Panicum comorense
 Brachiaria comorensis = Panicum comorense  
 Brachiaria decaryana = Panicum comorense  
 Brachiaria digitarioides = Panicum hemitomon 
 Brachiaria glabrinodis = Paspalum glabrinode 
 Brachiaria grossaria = Paspalum variabile 
 Brachiaria hubbardii = Acroceras hubbardii  
 Brachiaria karumiensis = Eriochloa succincta 
 Brachiaria longifolia = Echinochloa colona 
 Brachiaria obtusa = Hopia obtusa 
 Brachiaria obtusiflora = Echinochloa rotundiflora  
 Brachiaria paspaloides = Urochloa glumaris  
 Brachiaria rovumensis = Eriochloa rovumensis  
 Brachiaria sadinii = Panicum sadinii  
 Brachiaria setigera = Urochloa setigera  
 Brachiaria squarrosa = Panicum peteri 
 Brachiaria stipitata = Echinochloa callopus 
 Brachiaria stolonifera = Urochloa mosambicensis 
 Brachiaria tatianae = Rupichloa acuminata  
 Brachiaria venezuelae = Panicum venezuelae

See also
 List of Poaceae genera

References

Poaceae genera
Panicoideae
Cereals